This article lists the Social Democratic and Labour Party's election results in UK parliamentary elections.

Summary of general election performance

February 1974 general election

October 1974 general election

1979 general election

By-elections, 1979–1983

1983 general election

By-elections, 1983–1987

1987 general election

By-elections, 1987–1992

1992 general election

1997 general election

By-elections, 1997–2001

2001 general election

2005 general election

2010 general election

By-elections, 2010–2015

2015 general election

2017 general election

2019 general election
The SDLP did not stand candidates in Belfast East, Belfast North or North Down in order to aid anti-Brexit and anti-Democratic Unionist Party candidates in those constituencies.

References

F. W. S. Craig, Chronology of British Parliamentary By-elections 1833-1987
UK General election results February 1974, Richard Kimber's Political Resources
UK General election results October 1974, Richard Kimber's Political Resources
UK General election results May 1979, Richard Kimber's Political Resources

Social Democratic and Labour Party
Election results by party in the United Kingdom